The USA Cycling Pro Road Tour is a professional and amateur road bicycle racing series organized by USA Cycling. It is the top road cycling series in the United States featuring criteriums, road races, stage races and omniums. Most events host races for both men and women and some events host races for men or women only.

Results

References

External links
 USA Cycling Pro Road Tour official website

Cycle racing in the United States